Let Us Play! is the fourth album by Coldcut, released on 8 September 1997. It was their first album to be released on their own label, Ninja Tune.
It was featured in the video game LittleBigPlanet for the PlayStation Portable

Track listing

LP version

Side one
 "Return to Margin"
 "Atomic Moog 2000 (Post Nuclear Afterlife Lounge Mix)"
 "Noah's Toilet"

Side two
 "More Beats + Pieces (Daddy Rips It Up Mix)"
 "Rubaiyat"
 "Pan Opticon"

Side three
 "Music 4 No Musicians"
 "Space Journey"
 "Timber"

Side four
 "Every Home a Prison"
 "Cloned Again"
 "I'm Wild About That Thing (The Lost Sex Tapes: Position 1)"

CD version

Disc one
 "Return to Margin"
 "Atomic Moog 2000 (Post Nuclear Afterlife Lounge Mix)"
 "More Beats + Pieces (Daddy Rips It Up Mix)"
 "Rubaiyat"
 "Pan Opticon"
 "Music 4 No Musicians"
 "Noah's Toilet"
 "Space Journey"
 "Timber"
 "Every Home a Prison" [featuring Jello Biafra]
 "Cloned Again"
 "I'm Wild About That Thing (The Lost Sex Tapes: Position 1)"

Disc two
 "Atomic Moog 2000 (Bullet Train)"
+"interactive toybox full of Coldcut games, toys & videos"

VHS version
 "Return To Margin"
 "Atomic Moog 2000 (Post Nuclear After Life Lounge)"
 "Noah’s Toilet"
 "More Beats and Pieces (Daddy Rips It Up Mix)"
 "Rubaiyat"
 "Pan Opticon"
 "Music 4 No Musicians"
 "Space Journey"
 "Timber"
 "Every Home a Prison"
 "Cloned Again"
 "I’m Wild About That Thing (The Lost Sex Tapes: Position 1)"

References

1997 albums
Coldcut albums
Ninja Tune albums